Gokulganga Rural Municipality is a Rural municipality in Ramechhap District of Bagmati Province in Nepal.

Demographics
At the time of the 2011 Nepal census, Gokulganga Rural Municipality had a population of 20,074. Of these, 69.5% spoke Nepali, 11.0% Tamang, 9.9% Sunwar, 5.5% Sherpa, 2.4% Yolmo, 1.1% Newar, 0.1% Maithili and 0.5% other languages as their first language.

In terms of ethnicity/caste, 42.7% were Chhetri, 14.3% Tamang, 10.7% Sunuwar, 8.1% Sherpa, 3.9% Hill Brahmin, 3.8% Gharti/Bhujel, 3.4% Sarki, 3.3% Newar, 2.6% Kami and 7.2% others.

In terms of religion, 71.3% were Hindu, 24.9% Buddhist, 3.5% Christian, and 0.3% others.

References

Rural municipalities in Ramechhap District
Ramechhap District
Populated places in Ramechhap District
Rural municipalities of Nepal established in 2017